This is a list of films which have placed number one at the weekend box office in Japan during 2005.

References
 Note: Click on the relevant weekend to view specifics.

2005
Japan
2005 in Japanese cinema